Guyana competed at the 2022 Commonwealth Games at Birmingham, England from 28 July to 8 August 2022. It was the nineteenth time that Guyana is represented at the Commonwealth Games.

On 5 July 2022, a team of 32 athletes (18 men and 14 women) competing in six sports was announced. Keevin Allicock and Aliyah Abrams were the country's flagbearers during the opening ceremony.

Competitors
The following is the list of number of competitors participating at the Games per sport/discipline.

Athletics

A squad of ten athletes was confirmed on 5 July 2022.

Men
Track and road events

Field events

Women
Track and road events

Field events

Badminton

Two players were confirmed on 5 July 2022.

Boxing

Three boxers were confirmed on 5 July 2022.

Men

Cycling

One cyclist was confirmed on 5 July 2022.

Road

Squash

A squad of four players was confirmed on 5 July 2022.

Singles

Doubles

Swimming

A squad of four swimmers was confirmed on 5 July 2022.

Men

Women

Table tennis

Guyana qualified men's and women's teams for the table tennis competitions. Eight players were selected on 27 June 2022.

Singles

Doubles

Team

References

External links
Guyana Olympic Association Facebook site

2022
Nations at the 2022 Commonwealth Games
Commonwealth Games